Pádraig Ó Cuilín, OESA was Bishop of Clogher from his appointment in 1517 until his death in 1534: with his archdeacon, Roderic Cassidy, he made the first written record of his diocese.

References

16th-century Roman Catholic bishops in Ireland
Pre-Reformation bishops of Clogher
1534 deaths
Augustinian friars